Delia Mathews (born 1990) is a New Zealand ballet dancer. She was a principal dancer at the Birmingham Royal Ballet.

Life 
Mathews was born in Rotorua, New Zealand, and began ballet lessons with her sister in Tauranga at the age of 5. When she was 15, she was accepted into the Royal Ballet School in London, and studied there for three years. On graduating, Mathews received the Dame Ninette de Valois Award for Most Outstanding Graduate. In 2008 she joined the Birmingham Royal Ballet and became a principal dancer in 2017.

In 2020, she left the company in order to return to New Zealand and raise her first child.

Delia and her husband, a British civil engineer, now run an off-grid hotel retreat they built near Tauranga.

References

External links
 Watercliff

1990 births
Living people
People from Rotorua
New Zealand ballerinas
Birmingham Royal Ballet principal dancers
People educated at the Royal Ballet School
New Zealand expatriates in the United Kingdom
21st-century ballet dancers
21st-century New Zealand dancers